Vladimir Khoroshunov (born 3   September 1984) is a  Kyrgyzstani football manager and former player. He is currently a manager at FC Kara-Balta. He was a member of the Kyrgyzstan national football team.

External links
ffrk.kg

1984 births
Kyrgyzstani footballers
Living people
Footballers at the 2010 Asian Games

Association footballers not categorized by position
Asian Games competitors for Kyrgyzstan
Kyrgyzstan international footballers